Van Wyck Mountain is a mountain located in the Catskill Mountains of New York east-southeast of Frost Valley. Hemlock Mountain is located north, Woodhull Mountain is located west-southwest, Samson Mountain is located southeast, Bangle Hill is located south, and Wildcat Mountain is located northwest of Van Wyck Mountain.

References

Mountains of Ulster County, New York
Mountains of New York (state)